Brannel School is a co-educational secondary school located in St Stephen-in-Brannel, in Cornwall, England, UK. There are around 750 children aged 11–16 on roll.

The school was established in 1961 and was designated as a 'Beacon School' in 2000. Brannel School became a specialist college for English and the Performing Arts in 2005, and in November 2017 the school became an academy as part of the Cornwall Education Learning Trust.

Brannel School offers a broad curriculum for students with options being studied in Years 10 and 11. The school also has a specialist provision for students with severe physical disabilities.

The Bell Theatre
The Bell Theatre is a theatre and cinema located at Brannel School. Named after a previous headteacher, Mr Ray Bell, the 200-seat venue plays host to various touring and community theatre productions, as well as being used as a facility pupils attending the school. In September 2015 digital cinema projection equipment was installed in the theatre, and the venue also now shows films for the local community.

References

External links

Brannel School official website
The Bell Theatre & Cinema website

Secondary schools in Cornwall
Educational institutions established in 1961
1961 establishments in England
Academies in Cornwall